Hudson Creighton is an Australian rugby union player who plays for the  in Super Rugby. His playing position is centre. He was named in the Reds squad for the 2021 Super Rugby AU season.

Reference list

External links
Queensland Reds profile

Australian rugby union players
Living people
Rugby union centres
Year of birth missing (living people)
Queensland Reds players
ACT Brumbies players